B. orientalis may refer to:

 Bagrus orientalis, a fish species found in Malawi and Tanzania
 Bangasternus orientalis, the yellow starthistle bud weevil, a beetle species native to southern Europe and the Mediterranean
 Batis orientalis, the grey-headed batis, a bird species found in Africa
 Berlinia orientalis, a legume species found in Mozambique and Tanzania
 Blatta orientalis, the oriental cockroach or waterbug, a large cockroach species
 Bolbena orientalis, a praying mantis species
 Bombina orientalis, the Oriental fire-bellied toad, a small semi-aquatic toad species found in Korea, north-eastern China and adjacent parts of Russia
 Braula orientalis, a bee lice fly species in the genus Braula 
 Brunnera orientalis, a plant species in the genus Brunnera
 Bunias orientalis, a plant species

See also
 Orientalis (disambiguation)